Vince Clements (born January 4, 1949) is a former American football running back. He played for the New York Giants from 1972 to 1973. He was acquired by the Giants along with Norm Snead, Bob Grim, a first rounder in 1972 (24th overall–Larry Jacobson) and a second rounder in 1973 (40th overall–Brad Van Pelt) from the Minnesota Vikings for Fran Tarkenton on January 27, 1972.

Before his pro career, Clements played college football for Connecticut, where he was a major contributor on the team.

References

External links
 

1949 births
Living people
American football running backs
UConn Huskies football players
New York Giants players
People from Southington, Connecticut
Players of American football from Connecticut